Bishrampur  Assembly constituency   is an assembly constituency in  the Palamu district in Indian state of Jharkhand.

Members of Legislative Assembly

See also
Palamu district
Palamu division
Vidhan Sabha
List of states of India by type of legislature

References

Assembly constituencies of Jharkhand
Palamu district